Schey is a surname. Notable people with the surname include:

 Gilles Schey (1644–1703), Dutch admiral
 Hermann Schey (1895–1981) German-born Dutch bass-baritone and voice teacher
 Pips Schey (1881–1957), Austro-Hungarian baron
 William Schey (1857–1913), Australian politician